The Namibia Christian Democratic Party was a political party in Namibia, led by Hans Röhr. It was founded in 1978 in Kavango. Wolfgang Adam was the honorary president of the party.

The party participated in the 1978 South West African Legislative Assembly elections, and won 2.8 percent of the votes.

See also

List of political parties in Namibia

References

Political parties with year of disestablishment missing
20th century in Namibia
Christian democratic parties in Africa
Defunct political parties in Namibia
Political parties established in 1978